The Republic of Acre or the Independent State of Acre were the names of a series of separatist governments in then Bolivia's Acre region between 1899 and 1903. The region was eventually annexed by Brazil in 1903 and is now the State of Acre.

History

For forty years, after around 1860, Acre had been overrun by Brazilians, who made up the vast majority of the population. The territory of Acre was assigned to Bolivia in 1867 by the Treaty of Ayacucho with Brazil. The rubber boom of the late 19th century attracted many Brazilian migrants to the region. In 1899–1900, the Spanish journalist and former diplomat Luis Gálvez Rodríguez de Arias led an expedition that sought to seize control of what is now Acre from Bolivia. The expedition was secretly financed by the Amazonas state government and aimed to incorporate Acre into Brazil after its independence from Bolivia. Gálvez declared himself president of the First Republic of Acre on July 14, 1899, and set up his capital at Puerto Alonso, which he renamed Cidade do Acre. That first republic lasted until March 1900, when the Brazilian government sent troops to arrest Gálvez and give Acre back to Bolivia. Gálvez was deported to Spain and the inhabitants of Acre found themselves up against both Bolivia and Brazil.

In November 1900 an attempt was made at creating a Second Acre Republic with Rodrigo de Carvalho as president. Again the movement was suppressed, and Acre remained part of Bolivia until 1903.

After the failure of the second attempt of Acre to secede from Bolivia, a veteran soldier from Rio Grande do Sul who had fought in the Federalist Revolution of 1893, José Plácido de Castro, was approached by the Acrean Revolution leaders and offered the opportunity to lead the independence movement against the Bolivians. Plácido, who had been working in Acre since 1899 as a chief surveyor of a surveying expedition and was about to go back to Rio de Janeiro, accepted the offer. He imposed strict military discipline and reorganized the revolutionary army, which reached 30,000 men.  The Acrean army won battle after battle and on January 27, 1903, José Plácido de Castro declared the Third Republic of Acre. President Rodrigues Alves of Brazil ordered Brazilian troops into Northern Acre in order to replace Plácido as the president of Acre. Through Barão do Rio Branco's most able ministerial diplomacy,  the question was settled.  After negotiations, a treaty was signed. The Treaty of Petrópolis, which was signed on November 11, 1903, gave Brazil Acre (191.000 km2) in exchange for lands in Mato Grosso, payment of two million pounds sterling and an undertaking to construct the Madeira-Mamoré Railroad that would allow Bolivia access to the outside world.   On February 25, 1904, it was officially made a federal territory of Brazil.

See also
Acre (state)

References

 "New Republic Founded: The Evolution of a South American No Man's Land," The Philadelphia Inquirer, Nov 12, 1899, p 7
"Acre Seeks Recognition: New South American Republic Sends a Minister to This Country," The New York Times, Nov 24, 1900, p 1
"Acre and Its Rubber: Cause of the Establishment of the New Republic," The New York Times, Nov 25, 1900, p 12
"A Short-Lived Republic: Acre, the Land of Rubber, No Longer a Separate Country," The New York Times, Nov 30, 1900, p 1
"Acre Belongs to Brazil: A Settlement of the 'Rubber Republic' Dispute," The Kansas City Star, Aug 12, 1903, p 4

External links
Evolution of the Acrean Flag

Republic of Acre
History of Acre (state)
Former countries in South America
Former republics
States and territories established in 1899
1899 establishments in South America
1903 disestablishments in South America
Acre